Profile of a Jazz Musician is an album by Paul Horn which was originally released on the Columbia label in 1962.

Reception

The Allmusic site awarded the album 4 stars calling it: "one of Horn's finer jazz dates".

Track listing
All compositions by Paul Horn except as indicated
 "Count Your Change" - 4:38
 "Now Hear This" - 4:09
 "Lazy Afternoon" (Jerome Moross, John Latouche) - 2:44
 "What Now?" (Paul Moer) - 4:07
 "Straight Ahead" (Moer) - 5:37
 "Fun Time" (Neal Hefti) - 3:41
 "Because We're Kids" (Friedrich Hollaender, Theodor Geisel) - 3:28
 "Abstraction" - 12:02

Personnel
Paul Horn - alto saxophone, flute, clarinet
Emil Richards - vibraphone
Paul Moer - piano
Victor Gaskin - bass
Milt Turner - drums

References

Paul Horn (musician) albums
1962 albums
Albums produced by Irving Townsend
Columbia Records albums